In Argentina, there are and have been cases of discrimination based on ethnic characteristics or national origin. In turn, racial discrimination tends to be closely related to discriminatory behavior for socio-economic and political reasons.

In an effort to combat racism in Argentine society, the National Institute Against Discrimination, Xenophobia and Racism (INADI) was created in 1995 by Federal Law 24515.

An older xenophobic slur was the use of the name  ('Goths', in the sense of barbaric people) for Spaniards or royalists during the Argentine War of Independence.

Anti-Semitism also exists in Argentina, in a context influenced by the large population of Jewish immigrants and a relatively high level of intermarriage between these immigrants and other communities.

In many cases, "social relations have become racialized"; for example, the term  is used to describe people who are considered uneducated, lazy or poor.

There is an active debate about the depth of racist conduct in Argentina. While some groups maintain that it is only a question of inoffensive or marginal behavior that is rejected by the vast majority of the population, other groups contend that racism is a widespread phenomenon that manifests itself in many different ways. Some groups also assert that racism in Argentina is no different from that which is present in any other country in the world, while other groups claim that Argentina's brand of racism manifests itself in a number of unique ways that are related to the country's history, culture, and the different ethnic groups that interact in the country.

Racial terms
A series of terms are used in Argentina that have a certain discriminatory intention and constitute a particular form of racism.

and 

Paradoxically, the same racist ideology in Argentina that maintains that "there are no  (of African ancestry) in Argentina" uses the word  to designate a vaguely defined population made up of workers, poor people, internal migrants, Latin-American immigrants, and natives, without any further distinction.

Víctor Ramos, the president of SOS Internacional, responded in the following manner when asked by a journalist what were the most common manifestations of racism in Argentina:

An example of this type of racism is the response given by a high-level official of the municipality of Escobar to two businessmen who wanted to set up a nightclub next to the rail station: 

There is such close identification between poverty, race, slums and marginalization in Argentina that philosopher José Pablo Feinmann compares these circumstances with the "Muslim question" in France.

In 1996, during a diplomatic  trip to the United States, when asked about the black population of Argentina, President Carlos Menem remarked:

It is also important to note that there is widespread use of the terms  and  that has a fraternal meaning totally devoid of discriminatory intention. Between friends and family they are common nicknames. For example, the famous late singer Mercedes Sosa is affectionately known as "Negra Sosa".

Derivations
  ( backwards) is another racist term with widespread use in Argentina, especially in Buenos Aires. The word is a product of a type of slang used in the Río de la Plata region that consists of inverting the syllables of words. A  is not necessarily a black person or someone of dark skin color. Basically it refers to a person who is denigrated for their social situation; frequently someone who belongs to the working class or who comes from a working-class family. A  can also refer to a person with light skin, hair, and eyes if the individual belongs to the working class or shows a taste for popular culture. More recently  or  has come to be associated with criminal conduct.

This word entered the lexicon in the second half of the 1970s. In the 1980s a famous television sketch called  was made as part of the show  featuring Cristina del Valle and Hugo Arana.

The rock group Babasónicos recorded an album entitled Groncho in 2000.
An example of this use is provided by the pianist Miguel Ángel Estrella when recalling the interrogations he endured in Uruguay when he was detained by the last military dictatorship during Operation Condor:

(literally, 'little black head') is an oft-used, historic racist term in Argentina. The word was coined after the Spanish name of a native bird, the hooded siskin.

The term was coined in Buenos Aires during the 1940s, when a large internal migration started from the rural northern provinces towards Buenos Aires and other large urban centers. The impetus for the migration was the newly created factory jobs that came about as a result of industrialization in Argentina.

The Argentine author Germán Rozenmacher (1936–1971) wrote a well-known short story in 1961 titled: "Cabecita negra" which depicted everyday racism in Argentina with stark reality. The plot deals with a mid-class citizen of European ancestry, who resents the increasing internal migration of impoverished people from northern Argentina to Buenos Aires. A portion of the story reads:

('head') is a derivation of  that has appeared more recently. It tends to refer to someone from the countryside, simple and unsophisticated, who lives in the city. The word is also used by some groups of young people to refer to someone who is viewed as undesirable, badly dressed, unpleasant; someone who falls outside of what is considered to be the "correct" style.

The word  ('Indian') is much less racially charged than the term  in common Argentine language. There has been a minor trend over the last several decades of naming children with indigenous names such as Ayelén, Maitén, or Lautaro, a trend that forced the Argentine government to revise its laws prohibiting the use of indigenous names.

Nevertheless, the term is sometimes used with a racist subtext. For example, the phrase: "¡!" ('You children look like Indians!'), although no longer heavily used, implies 'dirty' or 'disorganized'. Other examples such as: "" ('When I was a kid I was an absolute Indian') and "" ('My little brother is an Indian') are still used to refer to someone who has violent or irrational attitudes, or who acts impulsively.

The historical term malón, which describes the Mapuche mounted raids on colonial and Argentine settlements to plunder cattle and supplies from  the 17th to the 19th century, is sometimes used in colloquial speech in the figurative, derogatory sense of "horde".

This is a generalized practice that is common to Latin America as a whole and not just Argentina, and is directly related to the effacement of non-European cultures.

The word mestizo is not used very often in daily speech, although it is relatively common in the context of social sciences and history, sometimes with racial connotations.

Although today it is known that biologically there is no such thing as a pure person, and various researchers have recycled the term to refer to any exchange of DNA, and various other experts assert that all peoples and races are the result of prior mixing of races, during the Spanish colonization of the Americas the idea was imposed that  should be applied only to those persons of mixed indigenous and European ancestry, in order to demarcate their difference from the pure people who were generally of European ancestry.

Commenting on this phenomenon, historian Hugo Chumbita asserted that "there has been and continues to be resistance to revising official history due to the idea that by corroborating the mixed racial origin of San Martín, then Argentina's image would be tarnished." In a similar vein, an Argentine newspaper reported that conservatives voices were complaining: "If the founding father is a mestizo bastard, then so is Argentina."

The term's derogatory nature comes precisely from the speaker's indifference to the immigrant's identity and a disrespect towards their indigenous background.

The term is also used by River Plate football fans and the argentine people to denigrate Boca Juniors fans, because many Bolivian immigrants prefer Boca instead of River. River fans and the argentine people  mock Boca, saying things like "Boca is a Bolivian team" or "All Boca fans are Bolivians" and always see the Bolivians as "dirty untermenschen with a veddy horrible smell", calling Boca dirty and smelly untermenschen bolivianos as a nickname.

The following interview with a rugby player demonstrates how the term is used:

Types of racism in Argentina

"White-European" racism and Article 25 of the Constitution
In Argentina, an extensive racist ideology has been built on the notion of European supremacy. This ideology forwards the idea that Argentina is a country populated by European immigrants  (straight off the boat), frequently referred to as "our grandfathers", who founded a special type of "white" and European society that is not Latin-American. In addition, this ideology holds forth that cultural influences from other communities such as the Aborigines, Africans, fellow Latin-Americans, or Asians are not relevant and even undesirable.

White-European racism in Argentina has a history of government participation. The ideology even has a legal foundation that was set forth in Article 25 of the National Constitution sponsored by Juan Bautista Alberdi. The article establishes a difference between European immigration (which should be encouraged) and non-European immigration.

Alberdi, the article's sponsor and the father of the Argentine Constitution of 1853, explained in his own words the basis for White-European discrimination:

The discrimination between European and non-European immigration established by Article 25 of the Constitution has survived all subsequent constitutional reforms (1860, 1868, 1898, 1949, 1957, 1972 and 1994).

Alberdi claimed that the "races which could improve the species" in Argentina where those that originated from Northwestern Europe, chiefly England and France. Alberdi was of Basque descent and as such carried a special grudge towards Spain where Basques were often an oppressed minority. Alberdi was also very partial to France where he spent much of his life in exile and where he died in 1884. In this way, despite the predominantly Hispanic, Mediterranean, Latin, and Catholic culture of Argentina, Alberti proposed a semi-nordicist policy somewhat similar to the later White Australia policy and the United States Immigration Act of 1924.

Alberdi, who was a proponent of French being the national language of Argentina, believed that Hispanic and Christian traditions were enemies of progress and supported discrimination against  Portuguese, Spanish, Italian, and Jewish immigration.

On the other hand, Argentine racist ideology against Jews became stronger over time. The apex of this tendency occurred when the Argentina foreign minister during the presidency of Roberto M. Ortiz issued a secret order in 1938 to deny Jewish immigrants visas to Argentina.

Anti-Semitism
Leonardo Senkman, editor of the book Antisemitism in Argentina, stated:

Serious acts of racism against Jews have been committed in Argentina, such as the Argentine Chancellor's secret order in 1938 to prevent the arrival of Jews on national territory  and the terrorist attacks on the Israeli embassy in 1992 and the Asociación Mutual Israelita Argentina in 1994. The terrorist attacks against Jewish targets has sparked a debate between those who believe that they were not anti-Semitic acts and those who believe that the attacks were the "worst act of anti-Semitism since the second world war".

In an attempt to synthesize the positions of both sides of the debate, the researcher Daniel Lvovich has written:

In 1937, during the government of Augustín P. Justo, the Argentine consul in Gdynia, Poland sent several notes to the Minister Carlos Saavedra Lamas under the heading "Jewish problem" that demonstrate the generalized anti-Semitic sentiment of the Argentine government. In a letter sent July 13, 1937, on the eve of the Nazi invasion, the consul wrote:

During the military regimes in Argentina, and especially during the dictatorship known as the Proceso de Reorganización Nacional, serious acts of anti-Semitic persecution occurred. Some were tortured, degraded, and even murdered for the sole fact of being Jewish. In the secret detention centers it was common practice to burn the Star of David onto the bodies of Jewish prisoners. Ramon Camps, the Chief of Police in Buenos Aires, who allegedly kidnapped and tortured Jacobo Timerman, claimed that Zionists were enemies of Argentina and had a plan to destroy the country. This ideology was used as a pretext to implement illegal repressive methods to resolve what was referred to as "the Jewish issue".

Antisemitism in daily life is widely apparent in Argentina. A prime example of this occurs regularly at the Atlanta association football club located in the Villa Crespo neighborhood of Buenos Aires, a district that has a significant Jewish population. For several years now the fans of opposing teams root for their clubs by waving Nazi flags and throwing soaps onto the playing field.

A report by the DAIA revealed that discriminatory acts against Jews in Argentina rose 32% in 2006.

Racism against other Latin-Americans
Paraguayans and Bolivians were the two principal sources of Latin American immigrants to Argentina in 2007. It is estimated that almost 5% of the population in Argentina is from Paraguay or Bolivia, or has Bolivian or Paraguayan ancestors.

Another incident was the racially motivated murder of Marcelina Meneses and her ten-month-old son Josua Torrez who were pushed under a moving train near the Avellaneda station on July 10, 2001. The Bolivian community in Argentina protested with the slogan "Do not forget Marcelina".

Legacy

Contemporary demographics

The current Argentine population reflects the former immigration policy conducted by the government in the 19th and 20th century only partially, considering that Italians and Spaniards were not intended to predominate as they do. There are also significant Germanic, Slavic, British,  Levantine and French populations.

In 2001, Afro-Argentine activist Pocha Lamadrid and founder of the NGO África Vive collaborated with the Buenos Aires Ombudsman's Office to carry out an "Afro-Argentine census" in Buenos Aires, in parallel to the national census being held that year, as the official census did not include questions regarding race self-identification. According to Lamadrid, as of 2002 there were "at least 2 million" Argentines of African descent, but many of them ignore their background due to pervasive racism deeply entrenched in Argentine society. Lamadrid's activism contributed to the 2010 Argentine national census including a question on Afro-Argentine background.

See also

Demographics of Argentina
Stereotypes of Argentines

References

 
Argentina
Argentina
Argentina